Up to His Neck is a 1954 British comedy film directed by John Paddy Carstairs and starring Ronald Shiner as Jack Carter, Hattie Jacques as Rakiki and Anthony Newley as Tommy. It was shot at Pinewood Studios near London with sets designed by the art director Alex Vetchinsky.

Plot
Sailor Jack Carter has been marooned for ten years on a South Seas island, and treated as a King by natives. He is eventually rescued by the Royal Navy, who then use him to train up commandos to recover a stolen submarine, and to foil an oriental criminal plot.

Cast

References

External links

1954 films
1954 comedy films
British comedy films
Military humor in film
Films directed by John Paddy Carstairs
Films with screenplays by John Paddy Carstairs
Films scored by Benjamin Frankel
Films with screenplays by Ted Willis, Baron Willis
Films with screenplays by Patrick Kirwan
Films set in the Pacific Ocean
British black-and-white films
Films shot at Pinewood Studios
1950s English-language films
1950s British films